São Bento (Portuguese for Saint Benedict) may refer to:

Places

Brazil
Colégio de São Bento, Rio de Janeiro, a school in Rio de Janeiro
Mosteiro de São Bento (São Paulo), a monastery in the center of São Paulo
São Bento (São Paulo Metro), a railway station near the monastery
Pinhal de São Bento, Paraná
São Bento, Maranhão, Maranhão
São Bento, Paraíba, Paraíba
São Bento Abade, Minas Gerais
São Bento do Norte, Rio Grande do Norte
São Bento do Sapucaí, São Paulo
São Bento do Sul, Santa Catarina
São Bento do Tocantins, Tocantins
São Bento do Trairi, Rio Grande do Norte
São Bento do Una, Pernambuco
Serra de São Bento, Rio Grande do Norte

Portugal

São Bento (Porto de Mós), a parish in the municipality of Porto de Mós 
São Bento (Angra do Heroísmo), a parish in the municipality of Angra do Heroísmo, Azores
São Bento Palace, in Lisbon, residence of the Portuguese prime minister
São Bento railway station, in Porto

Sports

Associação Atlética São Bento, a defunct Brazilian football club
Esporte Clube São Bento, a Brazilian football club

Other
São Bento (carrack), Portuguese ship wrecked off the Mbhashe River mouth, South Africa in 1554